Champion High School is a public high school in Champion Township, Ohio, United States, near Warren. It is the only high school in the Champion Local School District. Sports teams are called the Flashes, and they compete in the Ohio High School Athletic Association as a member of the All-American Conference.

Athletics

OHSAA State Championships

 Girls Softball – 1978, 1980, 1994, 2011, 2012, 2015, 2017, 2018, 2019
 Boys Baseball – 2017 
Boys Bowling - 2014

External links
 District Website

Notes and references

High schools in Trumbull County, Ohio
Public high schools in Ohio